Bradwell is an ancient village and modern district in Milton Keynes, Buckinghamshire, England. It has also given its name to a modern civil parish that is part of the City of Milton Keynes.  The village was adjacent to  Bradwell Abbey, a Benedictine priory, founded in 1155 and dissolved in about 1540, but the abbey and its immediate environs were always a separate ecclesiastical parish.

The village name is an Old English language word and means broad spring. In the Domesday Book of 1086 the village was recorded as Bradewelle. 

There was an YHA youth hostel in the village (near the church and Bradwell Bury), at : the YHA closed it during the COVID-19 pandemic and terminated its lease in 2021.

Civil Parish
The parish of Bradwell consists of the Bradwell village grid square, along with Bradwell Abbey, Heelands, Rooksley, and Bradwell Common. The parish had a population of 9,657 according to the 2011 census. The parish is bounded by the railway line or the A5 to the west, Monks Way to the north, Portway to the east, and Dansteed Way to the south.

St. Lawrence's Church is a Grade II*-listed building, dating from the 13th century, and receiving its first vicar in 1223. It is believed to contain the oldest change ringing bells still in use, which were cast in 1297 by Michael de Wymbish of London.

Adjoining the sports field is the Bradwell Conservation Area, which is centered on St Lawrence's Field and is administered by the parish council as a nature conservation area.

On Vicarage Road is the Bradwell Memorial Hall, built as the village's war memorial after World War I.

On Primrose Road is King George's Field in memorial to King George V with a children's play area.

History and heritage

Bradwell Village 
Bradwell Bury beside the parish church is a moated site and the remains of an associated manor house which once formed part of a more extensive monument: it is Scheduled Monument. The nearby Bradwell Castle mound is also a Scheduled Monument. Bradwell House and the Church of St James are Grade II* listed; there are a further 25 buildings and structures listed as Grade II.

Bradwell Abbey

Bradwell Abbey is a Scheduled Monument, urban studies site (and a modern district). The site was once the location of a Benedictine priory, founded in 1155. The only remaining ecclesiastic building, the Chapel of St Mary, is a Grade I listed building. There are a further five Grade II listed buildings or structures on the Abbey grounds.

Bradwell railway station

Bradwell railway station, which was on the Wolverton–Newport Pagnell branch line, served Bradwell fron  1867 to 1964. In the present day, the former railway line (now a rail trail that is part of the redway network) forms the boundary between Bradville (in Stantonbury CP) and New Bradwell CP; the station platform is on the New Bradwell side.

Sport and Leisure

Bradwell has a Non-League football team Old Bradwell United F.C. who play at Abbey Road, where there is a large sports field with a cricket pitch and several football pitches. The Old Bradwell Tennis Club is also affiliated to the Bradwell Sports and Social Club which has the use of these facilities. 

Bradwell Bowls Club enters competitive teams in the local league.

Rooksley, at the western edge of the parish, has an important Karting track (not in Bradwell parish).

Demography 

See also

New Bradwell
Bradville

References

External links
Bradwell Parish website
Bradwell Abbey and City Discovery Centre (located within the parish)
'Parishes : Bradwell' – Victoria History of the Counties of England, A History of the County of Buckingham: Volume 4 (1927), pp. 283–288.
 Old Bradwell Tennis Club
 Bradwell Memorial Hall

Villages in Buckinghamshire
Areas of Milton Keynes
Civil parishes in Buckinghamshire